Bai Dongcai (January 3, 1916 – April 1, 2014) was a People's Republic of China politician. He was born in Qingjian County, Shaanxi Province. He was a relative of Bai Rubing, Communist Party Chief and governor of Shandong Province and Bai Enpei, Communist Party Chief and governor of Qinghai Province and Communist Party Chief of Yunnan Province. He was a member of the 12th Central Committee of the Communist Party of China.

1916 births
2014 deaths
People's Republic of China politicians from Shaanxi
Chinese Communist Party politicians from Shaanxi
Governors of Jiangxi
Political office-holders in Jiangxi